The Walsh Bay Wharves Precinct, also known as the Walsh Bay Arts Precinct, is a heritage-listed former wharf precinct, now converted to hospitality and entertainment purposes, at Hickson Road, in the inner city Sydney suburb of Millers Point in the City of Sydney local government area of New South Wales, Australia. It was designed by H. D. Walsh, who also supervised its construction from 1912 to 1921. It includes the MSB Bond Store No. 3 and the Parbury Ruins. It was added to the New South Wales State Heritage Register on 2 April 1999.

History 

The rocky terrain of Millers Point limited its early uses to fortifications (Dawes Point and Observatory Hill), anchorage for whalers (Walsh Bay) and windmills (the original Millers Point). Economic growth and population pressures resulted in more intensive settlement by the 1820s and land ownership was confirmed by a number of Crown grants in the 1830s.

The decade of the 1830s marks the firm beginning of the continuum of development which ended in the 1920s and which gives Millers Point/Walsh Bay its remarkable historic character today.

By the 1830s the present basic road system (Kent Street, Argyle Street, Windmill Street and Lower Fort Street) had appeared together with the earliest buildings still existing, such as the 1835 St Brigid's Roman Catholic Church. In the 1830s and 1840s, substantial merchant's residences appeared, together with early hotels such as the Lord Nelson Hotel (1834) and Hero of Waterloo Hotel (1844) and community buildings such as the Garrison Church (1840). The north shore ferry began operating from Walsh Bay to Blues Point in the 1840s, the location of its wharf still indicated by Ferry Lane. Other shipping wharves had appeared at Millers Point by the same decade, scattered irregularly along the shoreline from Dawes Point to Darling Harbour. Warehouses and hydraulic equipment were developed to service these wharves from the 1830s. Substantial construction of private terrace housing also occurred between the 1840s and the 1890s and led to the area being substantially built-up by 1900.

The residential character of the area changed during the late nineteenth century and the wealthier, who were concentrated along Argyle and Lower Fort Streets, gradually moved to more desirable suburbs with the growth of the city. Their place was taken, and the rows of terraces filled with the working population which serviced the waterfront. By the end of the century the area was considered to have substandard housing.

In 1900 the bubonic plague broke out in The Rocks and other parts of Sydney, causing widespread alarm and the resumption of most of The Rocks and Millers Point by the Government of New South Wales. Control of the area passed to the port authority, the Sydney Harbour Trust (later the Maritime Services Board, 1936). The Trust's primary commercial aim was to redevelop the wharfage along modern lines. However, because of the quantity of housing under its control it became landlord for Millers Point and between 1900 and the 1920s effectively transformed the area into a type of "company town". As well as the reconstruction of Walsh Bay, the Trust, together with the Government Housing Board, constructed workers' housing, shops, kindergartens, hotels and warehouses and also refurbished and reconstructed many existing buildings. In this way the population which serviced the port was accommodated nearby with all its community facilities. By 1930 Millers Point had been reshaped into its present form by the Trust and the area and the nature of its population changed little until the 2010s, apart from a declining component of port workers in the population.

The Trust's greatest engineering work in Millers Point was the reconstruction of Walsh Bay. In doing this they made the second major modification to the landscape since the cutting of quarries above Kent Street and the making of the Argyle Cut in the early 19th century. The Engineer-in-Chief of the Trust, H. D. Walsh (after whom the bay was subsequently named), designed and constructed a new system of wharves, stores and associated roads and hydraulic systems to service them. A wide service road, Hickson Road, was excavated around the foreshore and the steep topography was used ingeniously to service the wharves at two levels. The wharves were technologically advanced for the time. They were constructed on a standard modular timber design and incorporated an innovative and successful ratproof seawall.

Construction of the whole complex took place between 1906 and 1922. Wharf 1 was completed in 1913. Wharf 2/3 and sheds were completed in 1920-1921. Wharf 4 /5 and sheds completed in 1920-1921. Wharf 6 /7 and sheds completed in 1918. Wharf 8 /9 and sheds completed in 1912. The Administrative Block was completed . Wharf 10A /10B was completed in 1906-1908 and sheds altered in 1918-1921 but later demolished in 1976.

Superseded by changing shipping technology in the 1970s, the Walsh Bay complex is believed to be the only one of its type surviving in the world.

Description 

The Walsh Bay Wharves Precinct is an integrated port precinct comprising wharves, shore sheds, bond stores, bridges and roads. A standard modular timber design was developed for the wharves, wharf sheds and shore sheds so that they could easily be adapted to the requirements of individual sites. Some structures predate the Sydney Harbour Trust work (such as the remains of Towns Bond, Bond Stores Nos. 1 & 3).

Rows of piles are capped with a  iron-bark headstock and tied together by  iron-bark girders at  centres. The whole was covered with  brush-box decking. Later this was covered with a 4in thick concrete deck.

The wharf sheds (typically two storey) are of simple post and beam construction with  hardwood storey posts at  centres supporting  joists and  bearers covered with  hardwood decking and  diagonal sheathing. The joists are supplemented with adjustable steel trussing. Oregon roof trusses forming a double gable are supported on  hardwood storey posts at  centres. Ventilation and clerestory lighting are features of the wharf shed roof. Wall cladding consists of 20 ft wide infill panels of hardwood weatherboards, sliding doors, glazed sashes or galvanised iron. Roofs are galvanised iron or asbestos cement. Travelling platforms run the full length of the wharf shed.

Shore sheds are of similar construction but typically irregularly shaped. They sit on solid fill retained by the precast concrete sea wall. The shed facades to Hickson Road are of brick.

Overpass Bridges above Hickson Road give access to the upper levels of each shore shed. Hickson Road which was quarried from the sandstone cliffs gives sea level access. Wharf 1 is a long shore wharf with cement rendered wharf shed facade to Hickson Road. Outstanding feature is deep timber balcony to Harbour side end. Wharves 2/3 and 4/ 5 are finger wharves with two storey wharf and shore sheds, brick facades to Hickson Road. Wharf 6/7 is a finger wharf with one storey wharf shed and two storey shore shed, brick facade to Hickson Road. Wharf 8/9 is a finger wharf with two storey wharf and shore shed and adjoining administration block, overhanging top storey. An improved rat proof sea wall designed by Walsh. It was "L" shaped and constructed of precast reinforced concrete trestles and erected at Walsh Bay between 1907 and 1910.

The hydraulic power system of wharves 8 and 9 is one of the most important power systems developed in the nineteenth century. The system includes the accumulator, pump and electric motor, the high pressure pipes and 3 ton hydraulic lift and two hydraulic hoists and was an essential part of the operations of the wool handling wharves, supplying power to lift hoists and the original wool dumps (bale presses). Other original features include bale elevators, bale elevator platforms, remnants of the bale stacking systems, trucking gangway and openings for the nine hinged wool chutes. Other industrial and engineering artefacts include ladderways, bale hoists, overhead pulley systems, floor hatches, wooden rollers, a hydraulic ram and cat hoists, overhead travelling cranes, a lifting beam, electric lifts, wool bale drops, wool slides, hoist wells, mooring piles and heavy timber bracings.

Heritage listing 

The Walsh Bay area is of State cultural significance due to its unique combination of steep rocky terrain, early, mid, late-Victorian and Edwardian housing, surviving relatively intact Victorian bond stores, and the results of an early twentieth century urban redevelopment scheme of unique scale: the magnificent timber wharf and shore structures and associated rock cuttings, roads and bridges. The Walsh Bay Wharves and associated buildings and works are a virtually intact port and stevedoring facility created by the Sydney Harbour Trust in response to the requirements of maritime trade at the time (1900s-1910s). The precinct documents the workings of a technologically advanced early twentieth century shipping port, developed specifically to accommodate new mechanised transportation technology. The wharves have a strong distinctive character created by the logical use of heavy timber construction and the regular grid layout of piles, columns, beams and infill cladding. The precinct is unified in materials, form and scale and contains structures demonstrating maritime uses. It demonstrates the life of inner Sydney in the early twentieth century. The precinct demonstrates technical and creative excellence of the period 1820-1930.

Walsh Bay Wharves Precinct was listed on the New South Wales State Heritage Register on 2 April 1999 having satisfied the following criteria.

The place is important in demonstrating the course, or pattern, of cultural or natural history in New South Wales.

The Walsh Bay Wharves and their associated infrastructure are a virtually intact port and stevedore works created by the Sydney Harbour Trust in response to the requirements of maritime trade at that time. The precinct documents the workings of a technologically advanced early twentieth century shipping port, developed specifically to accommodate new mechanised transportation technology.

The place is important in demonstrating aesthetic characteristics and/or a high degree of creative or technical achievement in New South Wales.

The wharves have a strong distinctive character created by the logical use of heavy timber construction and the regular grid layout of piles, columns, beams and infill cladding. The precinct is unified in materials, form and scale and contains structures demonstrating maritime uses.

The place has a strong or special association with a particular community or cultural group in New South Wales for social, cultural or spiritual reasons.

The precinct demonstrates the life of inner Sydney in the early twentieth century.

The place has potential to yield information that will contribute to an understanding of the cultural or natural history of New South Wales.

The Walsh Bay Wharves and associated infrastructure demonstrate technical and creative excellence of the period 1820-1930.

The place possesses uncommon, rare or endangered aspects of the cultural or natural history of New South Wales.

Last intact complex of its type in the world.

The place is important in demonstrating the principal characteristics of a class of cultural or natural places/environments in New South Wales.

Best example of characteristic early 20th century port infrastructure in Sydney.

See also 

Australian non-residential architectural styles

References

Bibliography

Attribution

External links
 
 

New South Wales State Heritage Register sites located in Millers Point
Wharves in Australia
Articles incorporating text from the New South Wales State Heritage Register
Commercial buildings completed in 1921
1921 establishments in Australia